Kearsley Shire was a local government area in the Hunter region of New South Wales, Australia.

Kearsley Shire was proclaimed (as Cessnock Shire) on 7 March 1906, one of 134 shires created after the passing of the Local Government (Shires) Act 1905. 

The shire's name and boundaries were often changed. The Municipality of Cessnock was excised from the Shire on 1 November 1926.  The balance of the Shire was renamed Kearsley Shire . The shire absorbed the Municipality of Greta on 1 January 1934. On 6 June 1944, part of the shire merged with Tarro Shire and Bolwarra Shire to form Lower Hunter Shire, part merged with the Municipality of East Maitland, Municipality of West Maitland and Municipality of Morpeth to form the Municipality of Maitland and the balance reconstituted as Kearsley Shire.

The shire office was in Cessnock.  Other towns and villages in the shire included Branxton, Greta and Kearsley.

The Shire was unique by being the only local government having majority control by the Communist Party of Australia, from a period of 1944 to 1947.

Kearsley Shire amalgamated with the Municipality of Cessnock to form Municipality of Greater Cessnock on 1 January 1957.

References

Former local government areas of New South Wales
1906 establishments in Australia
1957 disestablishments in Australia